"Labels or Love" is a single by American singer-songwriter Fergie from the soundtrack for the motion picture Sex and the City (2008).

Background
The song samples parts of the Sex and the City theme song. The song was released in Brazil on May 4, 2008, after an exclusive premiere on Jovem Pan FM, one of the major radio stations in Brazil. The song was officially sent to US and Australian radios on June 3, 2008. The song debuted at number 28 on the Australian ARIA Singles Chart, and in its second week ascended into the top 20 and has peaked at number 15. In the UK, the single peaked only at number 56. The song was nominated for the People's Choice Awards for "Favorite Song From a Soundtrack", but lost to Mamma Mia! by Meryl Streep. A music video for the single was never issued owing to the song's poor performance. Currently the song's instrumental serves as the opening theme for South Korean cosmetic surgery series "Let Me In".

Track listing
 Australian CD Single
 "Labels or Love" - 3:52
 "Labels or Love" (VKZ Remix) - 4:18

 Australian Maxi Single
 "Labels or Love" - 3:52
 "Labels or Love" (Instrumental) - 4:03
 "Sex & The City" (Theme) - 1:30

Charts

Certifications

References

2008 singles
Fergie (singer) songs
Songs written by Rico Love
Songs written by Fergie (singer)
Songs written by Salaam Remi
Song recordings produced by Salaam Remi
2008 songs
A&M Records singles
Songs written for films